Socotroonops is a genus of spiders in the family Oonopidae. It was first described in 2002 by Saaristo & van Harten. , it contains only one species, Socotroonops socotra.

References

Oonopidae
Monotypic Araneomorphae genera
Spiders of Africa
Endemic fauna of Socotra